Leicester Devereux, 7th Viscount Hereford (1674–1683) was a British Peer.  He was the eldest son of Leicester Devereux, 6th Viscount Hereford (1617–1676) and succeeded to the title as an infant.  He died young and was succeeded by his younger brother Edward. Edward died at the age of 25 in 1700 and the viscountcy passed to a Welsh cousin Price Devereux of Vaynor Park, Montgomeryshire.  Edward's sister Anne outlived her brothers, becoming the heiress: she married Leicester Martin.

References
 Sir Egerton Brydges, Collins's Peerage of England VI (1812) p. 19
 Welsh Biography Online

1674 births
1683 deaths
Leicester 7
Leicester

Royalty and nobility who died as children